Babette Johanna Adriana de Leede (born 8 October 1999) is a Dutch cricketer who plays as a wicket-keeper and right-handed batter. She played for the Netherlands women's national cricket team in the 2015 ICC Women's World Twenty20 Qualifier in November 2015.

In June 2018, she was named in the Netherlands' squad for the 2018 ICC Women's World Twenty20 Qualifier tournament. She made her Women's Twenty20 International (WT20I) debut for the Netherlands against United Arab Emirates in the World Twenty20 Qualifier on 7 July 2018. In July 2018, she was named in the ICC Women's Global Development Squad.

In May 2019, she was named in Netherlands' squad for the 2019 ICC Women's Qualifier Europe tournament in Spain. In August 2019, she was named in the Dutch squad for the 2019 ICC Women's World Twenty20 Qualifier tournament in Scotland. In October 2021, she was named in the Dutch team for the 2021 Women's Cricket World Cup Qualifier tournament in Zimbabwe.

During that Qualifier she made 78 runs against Sri Lanka on November 23, 2021.

In May 2022, de Leede played five matches for the Sapphires team at the 2022 FairBreak Invitational T20 in Dubai, United Arab Emirates. During the Invitational, she scored a total of 85 runs, took one catch, and achieved seven stumpings. In her team's match against the Falcons team, she made 45 runs, racked up a world record of five stumpings, and was awarded player of the match. Of the experience of playing at the FairBreak tournament, she has since said:

In 2022 Babette made 75 for Western Province Women against Eastern Cape at Newlands.

In August 2022 she topscored with 122* for her team Voorburg CC against Quick in the Dutch domestic 40-over league. Later that month (on August 26) she made 76 in a One Day International against Ireland at her home ground, Westvliet.

In november 2022 De Leede made 33, 37, 30 and 59 in four consecutive ODIs against Thailand in Chiangmai, propelling her to the 46th spot in the ICC One Day International rankings.

References

External links
 
 

1999 births
Living people
Dutch women cricketers
Netherlands women One Day International cricketers
Netherlands women Twenty20 International cricketers
People from Leidschendam
Western Province women cricketers
Sportspeople from South Holland
20th-century Dutch women
21st-century Dutch women